The 2001–02 ISU Junior Grand Prix was the fifth season of the ISU Junior Grand Prix, a series of international junior level competitions organized by the International Skating Union. It was the junior-level complement to the Grand Prix of Figure Skating, which was for senior-level skaters. Skaters competed in the disciplines of men's singles, ladies' singles, pair skating, and ice dance. The top skaters from the series met at the Junior Grand Prix Final.

Competitions
The locations of the JGP events change yearly. In the 2001–02 season, the series was composed of the following events:

Series notes
Following the September 11, 2001 attacks, the United States Figure Skating Association cancelled the Junior Grand Prix event to be held in Arizona and did not allow their skaters to compete on the Junior Grand Prix for the rest of the season.

Junior Grand Prix Final qualifiers
The following skaters qualified for the 2001–02 Junior Grand Prix Final, in order of qualification.

Gregor Urbas was given the host wildcard spot to the Junior Grand Prix Final. He had finished three spots below third alternate position in overall qualification standings. He placed 8th out of 9 competitors at the Final.

Medalists

Men

Ladies

Pairs

Ice dance

Medals table

References

External links
 2001–02 Results at ISU
 2001–02 Results at Skate Canada 
 ISU Junior Grand Prix of Figure Skating: 2nd event in Phoenix (USA) Cancelled
 JGP Bulgaria
 JGP Czech
 JGP Poland
 JGP Netherlands
 JGP Sweden
 JGP Italy
 JGP Japan

ISU Junior Grand Prix
2001 in figure skating
2001 in youth sport
2002 in youth sport